Laval station (French: Gare de Laval) is a railway station serving the town Laval, Mayenne department, western France. It is situated on the Paris–Brest railway.

The station is served by high speed trains to Paris and Rennes, and by regional trains (TER Pays de la Loire) towards Rennes, Angers, Le Mans and Nantes.

See also 

 List of SNCF stations in Pays de la Loire

References

Railway stations in Pays de la Loire
TER Pays de la Loire
Railway stations in France opened in 1855